Holmes Reservation is a conservation parcel located in Plymouth, Massachusetts. During the American Revolution, the land was used as a muster ground for the Plymouth militia. The property is owned by The Trustees of Reservations, starting with a donation, with endowment, by the Holmes family (descendants of John Holmes, an early settler of Plymouth and Messenger of the Court there) in 1944.

References

External links 
 The Trustees of Reservations: Holmes Reservation
 Trail map

The Trustees of Reservations
Protected areas of Plymouth County, Massachusetts
Open space reserves of Massachusetts
1944 establishments in Massachusetts
Protected areas established in 1944